The  is an archaeological site with the ruins of a Jōmon period settlement, located in what is now part of the city of Fujioka, Gunma Prefecture in the northern Kantō region of Japan. The site was designated a National Historic Site of Japan in 1948.

Overview
The site is located near the border of Gunma Prefecture with Saitama Prefecture on a river terrace of the Kanna River where the river makes a bend from east to north. It is within the grounds of the Mihara Elementary School Yuzurihara Branch School.

Some artifacts were discovered in the vicinity in 1933 and the actual site in 1937, with excavation taking place in 1946. The ruins were found to be a rectangular residence foundation consisting of flagstones, with approximate dimensions of 4.3 by 3.6 meters. In the center was a stone-lined rectangular hearth made from schist. Various stone tools, stone axes and stone jewelry along with clay figurines and Jōmon pottery were also found. These artifacts date the site to the early through late Jōmon period. Although a relatively small dwelling trace, when discovered it was considered a rare example of a building with a stone floor from this period and received National Historic Site designation. The site is now protected by a small museum.

See also

List of Historic Sites of Japan (Gunma)

References

External links
Fujioka home page 

Jōmon period
Fujioka, Gunma
Historic Sites of Japan
Archaeological sites in Japan
History of Gunma Prefecture